The 50th Pennsylvania House of Representatives District is located in southwest Pennsylvania and has been represented by Bud Cook since 2023.

District profile
The 50th Pennsylvania House of Representatives District is located in Washington County and all of Greene County and includes the following areas:

Greene County

Washington County

Allenport
Beallsville
Bentleyville
California
 Centerville
Charleroi
Coal Center
Cokeburg
Deemston
Dunlevy
East Bethlehem Township
Elco
Ellsworth
Long Branch
Marianna
North Bethlehem Township
North Charleroi
Roscoe
Speers
Stockdale
Twilight
West Bethlehem Township
West Brownsville
West Pike Run Township

Representatives

Recent election results

References

Government of Fayette County, Pennsylvania
Government of Greene County, Pennsylvania
Government of Washington County, Pennsylvania
50

External links
District map from the United States Census Bureau
Pennsylvania House Legislative District Maps from the Pennsylvania Redistricting Commission.  
Population Data for District 50 from the Pennsylvania Redistricting Commission.